It Is Wood, It Is Stone is the debut novel of Brazilian-American novelist Gabriella Burnham. It was first published by One World, an imprint of Random House, in 2020.

References 

2021 American novels
Novels set in Brazil